The 1969–70 NBA season was the 24th season of the National Basketball Association.  The season ended with the New York Knicks winning the NBA Championship, beating the Los Angeles Lakers 4 games to 3 in the NBA Finals.

Regular season
The 1969–70 season saw the NBA into a new decade as well as a new era. The retirement of Bill Russell from the Boston Celtics at the end of the 1968–69 season effectively signaled the end of the Celtics dynasty that had dominated the NBA for the past decade.

The New York Knicks were the top club in the league. They had a solid team of players led by star center Willis Reed and rising star guard Walt Frazier. Dave DeBusschere, who had been acquired from the Detroit Pistons the previous year, combined with Frazier and Reed to anchor the league's best defense. Coach Red Holzman led the club to wins in 60 of its 82 regular season games to pace the league.

In just their second season in the league, the Milwaukee Bucks totaled 56 wins helped by rookie superstar Lew Alcindor. Alcindor averaged 29 points per game on 52% shooting. He was also third in rebounds, seventh in shooting accuracy, and second in minutes played. Coach Larry Costello's team also had a strong backcourt of Jon McGlocklin and Flynn Robinson, and two ex-Cincinnati Royals, but Alcindor's arrival on the team nearly doubled their win total from the previous season, earning him rookie of the year honors.

The Baltimore Bullets also reached the 50-win plateau. Coach Gene Shue led a squad looking to improve after their early playoff exit the previous year. Guards Earl Monroe and Kevin Loughery were the team's main scoring threats, while center Wes Unseld and forward Gus Johnson excelled at rebounding, giving the Bullets more field goals than any other NBA team that year.

The Atlanta Hawks won the NBA's West Division title with 48 wins. Under coach Richie Guerin, they fielded a solid starting five, led again by scorer Lou Hudson. An early-season trade with Detroit netted star center Walt Bellamy.

Division standings

Eastern Division

Western Division

x – clinched playoff spot

Playoffs

Statistics leaders

NBA awards
Most Valuable Player: Willis Reed, New York Knicks
Rookie of the Year:  Lew Alcindor, Milwaukee Bucks
Coach of the Year: Red Holzman, New York Knicks

All-NBA First Team:
F – Billy Cunningham, Philadelphia 76ers
F – Connie Hawkins, Phoenix Suns
C – Willis Reed, New York Knicks
G – Walt Frazier, New York Knicks
G – Jerry West, Los Angeles Lakers

All-NBA Second Team:
F – Lou Hudson, Atlanta Hawks
F – Gus Johnson, Baltimore Bullets
C – Lew Alcindor, Milwaukee Bucks
G – John Havlicek, Boston Celtics
G – Oscar Robertson, Cincinnati Royals

All-NBA Rookie Team:
Dick Garrett, Los Angeles Lakers
Mike Davis, Baltimore Bullets
Jo Jo White, Boston Celtics
Lew Alcindor, Milwaukee Bucks
Bob Dandridge, Milwaukee Bucks

NBA All-Defensive First Team:
Dave DeBusschere, New York Knicks
Gus Johnson, Baltimore Bullets
Willis Reed, New York Knicks
Walt Frazier, New York Knicks
Jerry West, Los Angeles Lakers

NBA All-Defensive Second Team:
John Havlicek, Boston Celtics
Bill Bridges, Atlanta Hawks
Lew Alcindor, Milwaukee Bucks
Joe Caldwell, Atlanta Hawks
Jerry Sloan, Chicago Bulls

See also
1970 NBA Finals
1969–70 ABA season

Notes

References